Songkram Porpaoin (born 25 March 1966) is a  retired professional Minimumweight boxer  from Thailand. 
He's the twin younger brother of Chana Porpaoin, a two times WBA Minimumweight champion in 1990s.

Biography & career
Songkram  has a real name  Manatsanun Motma (มนัสนันท์ หมดมา; formerly: Kam Motma; ค้ำ หมดมา) born in Lom Sak District, Phetchabun Province. When his old brother Chana won the world champion his manager, Niwat "Chae-mae" Laosuwanwat of Galaxy Boxing Promotion is hoping to be the world's second twins world champion after the Galaxy brothers Khaosai-Khaokor Galaxy in 1980s.

Before his professional career he used to Muay Thai in the north region his native in the name "Kongla Sakchainarong" (ก้องหล้า ศักดิ์ชัยณรงค์; while his brother Chana used the name "Lomnua Sakchainarong"; ลมเหนือ ศักดิ์ชัยณรงค์) and was the champion of five times of the Lumpinee Boxing Stadium.

After Chana lost the world title for Rosendo Álvarez, a boxer from Nicaragua at the end of 1995. Songkram was supported for challenge with Álvarez on January 11, 1997, at Sa Kaeo Province but he was TKO in the 11th round. However, at the end of the same year he won PABA Minimumweight title by defeating old rival who has been draw in the last fight Randy Mangubat, a Filipino boxer with points and he defended it once.

Prior to that, in 1995 he was contacted as a challenger to the WBC & IBF Light flyweight world champions with Humberto González, a Mexican holder, but his manager Niwat Laosuwanwat declined, because it's best known Niwat is only cooperating with WBA (so González's challenger turned out to be Saman Sorjaturong).

On January 30, 1999, he challenge WBA Minimumweight interim title with Ronnie "Toy Bulldog" Magramo, a Filiipino contender at Pattaya, Chonburi province, eastern Thailand he was knocked down in the third round but he was the winner a close majority technical decision (75-75, 78–73, 76–74) in the eighth round because his head was bleeding from headbutted couldn't fight.

But four months later. He traveled to Japan to fight with Hiroshi Matsumoto, a Japanese boxer the result is he's defeated by the WBA disallowed, he was finally stripped.

Retirement
After retirement Songkram was life is very difficult and his wife had broken up with him. He has been ordained twice. Today he made a living by teaching full time at POM gym Bangkok, Thailand.

References

External links
 

Living people
1966 births
Mini-flyweight boxers
Songkram Porpaoin
Songkram Porpaoin
Songkram Porpaoin
Songkram Porpaoin